is a mountain of the Shokanbetsudake Mountains. It is located on the border between  Shintotsukawa and Ishikari, Hokkaidō, Japan.

Geology
Mount Okutoppu is made from non-alkaline mafic volcanic rock.

References 

Okutoppu